The 2011 season is the 59th season of competitive football in Burma.

National teams 

The home team or the team that is designated as the home team is listed in the left column; the away team is in the right column.

Senior

Friendly matches

2012 AFC Challenge Cup qualification

2014 FIFA World Cup qualification

Under-19

2012 AFC U-19 Championship qualification

Under-16

2012 AFC U-16 Championship qualification

League Tables

Myanmar National League

Burmese clubs in international competitions

Yadanarbon F.C.

References
 Burmese tables at Soccerway
 Myanmar national team at Soccerway